Yeray Cabanzón de Arriba (born 14 May 2003) is a Spanish footballer who plays as an attacking midfielder for Rayo Cantabria.

Club career
Born in Isla, Cantabria, Cabanzón joined Racing de Santander's youth setup in 2013, aged ten. He made his senior debut with the reserves on 5 September 2021, coming on as a half-time substitute in a 2–0 Segunda División RFEF home loss against Real Sociedad C.

Cabanzón made his first team debut on 6 October 2021, in a 2–1 home win over Arenas Club de Getxo for the year's Copa Federación de España. He featured in nine league matches for the main squad during the season, as Racing achieved promotion to Segunda División; on 19 July 2022, he also renewed his contract for the following two years.

Cabanzón made his professional debut on 8 January 2023, starting in a 1–1 away draw against UD Las Palmas in the second division.

References

External links

2003 births
Living people
Spanish footballers
Footballers from Cantabria
Association football midfielders
Segunda División players
Primera Federación players
Segunda Federación players
Rayo Cantabria players
Racing de Santander players